Benjy is a masculine given name, usually a diminutive form (hypocorism) of Benjamin. It is also a surname.

Benjy, Bengy or Bengie may refer to:

People
 Dudley Benjafield (1887–1957), British racing driver and doctor
 Benjamin Benjy Dial (1943–2001), American football quarterback
 Benjy King, a former member of the American rock band Scandal
 Benjamín Cintrón Lebrón, Puerto Rican politician nicknamed "Bengie"
 Bengie Molina (born 1974), former Major League Baseball catcher from Puerto Rico
 Otto Benjamin Benjy Taylor (born 1967), American college basketball head coach
 Anatole de Bengy (1824–1871), French Jesuit martyr
 Marie-Madeleine d'Houët (1781–1858), Viscountess de Bonnault d'Houet, née Marie-Madeleine-Victoire de Bengy, French founder of a religious institute of Religious Sisters known as the Faithful Companions of Jesus

Fictional characters
 Benjy Benjamin, in the film It's a Mad, Mad, Mad, Mad World, played by Buddy Hackett
 Benjamin "Benjy" Compson, in the novel The Sound and the Fury by William Faulkner and film adaptations thereof
 Benjamin "Benjy" Fleming, a character in the American TV series Monk
 Benjy Hawk, in the American soap opera Days of Our Lives
 Benjamin Richard Parker, the son of Mary Jane and Peter Parker (Spider-Man) in Marvel Comics
 Benjy Riordan, on the Irish soap opera The Riordans
 Benjy Stone, a main character in the film My Favorite Year
 Benjy, in the strip Ball Boy in the UK comic The Beano
 title character of Engie Benjy, a British stop-motion children's television series

See also
 Benjys, a defunct chain of sandwich shops in the United Kingdom
 Bengies Drive-In Theatre, Middle River, Maryland, United States
 Benji (disambiguation)

Masculine given names
Hypocorisms
Lists of people by nickname